interHeart   is a club for an information exchange and make relationship between international students who are studying in Korea.

Summary 
A club for international students to meet each other and the locals to learn Korean as well the Korean way of life in a fun and interesting way. By doing so, they also help promote multiculturalism in Korea through various cultural movements. They were gathered with few international students in Korea from 2006 to 2010 without an activity name, and then decided a name and logo and began interHeart activity in earnest from 2011. They are keeping in touch with about 10 university's international students, and some friends who back to their hometown, such as Malaysia, Cambodia, Hong Kong, United States, Vietnam, China, Japan, Mongolia, etc.

Origin of interHeart 
The compound word "interHeart" is formed from the words "inter-(prefix)" and "Heart".

Logo 
interHeart logo was created and designed by Yari Lee, founder of interHeart. Edited by Shunsuke Saito, webmaster of interHeart.

interHeart Activity 
These are their activities.

Campus Gathering 
 Seoul, Incheon, and Gyeonggi Province : Korea University (Every Wednesday), Kyung Hee University (Every Thursday), Inha University (Every Friday)

Saturday Gathering 
 May 2011 ~ December 2014 : Popeyes at Chungmuro in Seoul
 January 2015 ~ Current : McDonald's and BLISS & BLESS (Coffeehouse) at Myungdong in Seoul

interHeart Trip (Domestic, Overseas) 
2009
 June 9 ~ 11 : Seonyudo Island (Gunsan)
2010
 June 10 ~ 12 : Seonyudo Island (Gunsan)
2011
 July 4 ~ 6 : Busan
2012
 March 11 ~ 17 : Malaysia and Singapore
 April 20 ~ 21 : Gapyeong County
 June 15 ~ 17 : Busan
2013
 June 24 ~ 26 : Seonyudo Island (Gunsan)
2014
 February 17 ~ 19 : Jeju Island
 June 13 ~ 15 : Seonyudo Island (Gunsan)
 July 21 ~ 23 : Busan
2015
 July 3 ~ 5 : Busan

interHeart Christmas Party 
Since 2009, they have an annual Christmas Party at the end of the year.

Mobile Dental Clinic for international students 
2013
 May 4 : Inha University (Incheon)
 June 15 : Pungseong Multicultural Family Support Center (Incheon)
 October 26 : Jeonju University (Jeonju)
2014
 April 26 : Jeonju University (Jeonju)
 November 1 : Inha University (Incheon)
2015
 April 25 : Pukyong National University (Busan)

References

External links 
 interHeart.kr - interHeart Official website (10 languages : English, Korean,Simplified Chinese, Traditional Chinese, Japanese, Khmer, Mongolian, Russian, Vietnamese, Malay)

Organizations based in South Korea